People commonly known by their family name Faubert include:

 Frank Faubert, Canadian politician
 Ida Faubert, Haitian writer
 Jacques Faubert, Canadian composer and conductor
 Jocelyn Faubert, psychophysicist
 Julien Faubert, French football player
 Mario Faubert, Canadian ice hockey player and politician
 Pierre Faubert, Haitian poet/playwright